The Civil Service Association (CSA)  is a former trade union in Trinidad and Tobago which changed its name in 1971 to the Public Services Association

See also
 List of trade unions
 James Manswell

Defunct trade unions of Trinidad and Tobago
Civil service trade unions